Ian Marchant may refer to:

 Ian Marchant (author) (born 1958), English writer, broadcaster and performer
 Ian Marchant (businessman) (born 1961), English accountant and businessman